Storm tides of the North Sea are coastal floods associated with extratropical cyclones crossing over the North Sea, the severity of which are affected by the shallowness of the sea and the orientation of the shoreline relative to the storm's path, as well as the timing of tides. The water level can rise to more than 5 metres (17 ft) above the normal tide as a result of storm tides.

Northern Germany and Denmark are particularly susceptible to storm tides. The coastline of the German Bight forms an L-shape facing northwest. Also vulnerable are the United Kingdom and the Netherlands, where the sea shallows and is funnelled toward the English Channel.

Storm tides are a regular occurrence in the North Sea basin; several form each year. Although most do not cause significant damage, the impact of some has been devastating. During one, the February flood of 1825, the Danish coastline changed, as the North Jutlandic Island became separated from the Jutland Peninsula.

Major storm tides
 838, December 26, Netherlands, more than 2,400 deaths
 1014, September 28, Netherlands, several thousands of deaths
 1099, November 11, The Anglo-Saxon Chronicle states, that in London "On the festival of St Martin, the sea flood sprung up to such a height and did so much harm as no man remembered that it ever did before".
 1164, February 16, Saint Juliana flood, Netherlands and Germany, several thousands of deaths
 1170, November 1, All Saints' Flood, Netherlands, marks beginning of creation of Zuiderzee
 1206, Netherlands, 60,000 deaths
 1219, January 16, Saint Marcellus flood, Netherlands and Germany, 36,000 deaths struck West Friesland
 1248, a year with three storm tides in The Netherlands with major inundations
 1277, Netherlands and Germany, formation of Dollart
 1277, Netherlands and Germany, formation of Lauwerszee
 1282, Netherlands, separates island of Texel from mainland
 1287, December 13, Saint Lucia flood, Netherlands, formation of Waddenzee and Zuiderzee, 50,000–80,000 deaths. Major impact on Cinque Ports in England.
 1288, February 5, Saint Agathaflood, Netherlands, several thousands of deaths
 1322, Netherlands and Belgium, Flanders loses all coastal islands, many deaths especially in Holland, Zeeland and Flanders
 1334, November 23, Netherlands, several thousands of deaths
 1362, January 16, Grote Mandrenke (big drowner of men) or Saint Marcellus flood, Belgium, Netherlands, Germany and Denmark, created a great part of the Wadden Sea and caused the end of the city of Rungholt; 25,000 to 40,000 deaths, according to some sources 100,000 deaths
 1404, November 19, first Saint Elisabeth flood, Belgium and Netherlands, major loss of land
 1421, November 19, second Saint Elisabeth flood, Netherlands, storm tide in combination with extreme high water in rivers due to heavy rains, 10,000 to 100,000 deaths
 1424, November 18, third Saint Elisabeth flood, Netherlands
 1468, Ursula flood, should have been more forceful than second Saint Elisabeth flood
 1477, first Cosmas- and Damianus flood, Netherlands and Germany, many thousands of deaths
 1530, November 5, St. Felix's Flood, Belgium and Netherlands, many towns disappear, more than 100,000 deaths
 1532, November 1, All Saints flood, Belgium, Netherlands and Germany, several towns disappear, many thousands of deaths
 1570, November 1, All Saints flood, Belgium and Netherlands, several towns disappear, more than 20,000 deaths
 1571–72, unknown date, marine flooding on the Lincolnshire coast between Boston and Grimsby resulted in the loss of "all the saltcotes where the best salt was made".
 1634, October 11–12, Burchardi flood, broke the Island of Strand into parts (Nordstrand and Pellworm) in Nordfriesland
 1651, February 22 in Germany, March 4–5 Netherlands, St. Peter's Flood
 1663, December 7, The diarist Samuel Pepys noted "the greatest tide that ever was remembered in England to have been in this river, all Whitehall having been drowned."
 1686, November 12, Saint Martin flood, Netherlands, 1586 deaths
 1703, December 7, Great Storm of 1703, England, Belgium, Netherlands and Germany, many thousands of deaths
 1717, December 24, Christmas flood 1717, Netherlands, Germany and Scandinavia, more than 14,000 deaths
 1810, November 10, In Boston, Lincolnshire up to 10 deaths are thought to have occurred in the town due to a storm surge. 
 1825, February 3–5, February flood of 1825, Germany and Netherlands, 800 deaths
 1916, January 13–14, Zuiderland flood Netherlands, 16 casualties and ~300 km2 flooded around the Zuiderzee this flood led to the construction of the Afsluitdijk, creating the IJsselmeer.
 1949, January 8, Storm disturbance in the North Sea.
 1953, January 31 – February 1, North Sea flood of 1953, most severe in the Netherlands, leading to the Delta Works, 2533 deaths
 1962, February 16–17, North Sea flood of 1962, flooded one fifth of Hamburg and claimed 315 lives
 1976, January 3–4, Gale of January 1976
 1978, January 11–12, 1978 North Sea storm surge, East coast of England.
 1981, November 24–25, North Frisian Flood, severe surge with dike breaches in Denmark.
 1982, December 19, the largest negative surge recorded in the North Sea coincided with a high tide, water levels dropped rapidly posing a navigational hazard.
 1993, February 21, an internal surge in the North Sea and high waves brought flooding to the Norfolk Broads.
 1999, December 3, Cyclone Anatol
 2007, November 8–9, North Sea flood of 2007 (Tilo)
 2011, November 24–27, Cyclone Berit (Xaver) and "Lille Berit" (Yoda).
 2013, October 10, east coast of England surge (Xenon), Environment Agency warning of minor flooding and disruption, tide passed without major flooding.
2013, December 5–7, On 4 December the Environment Agency released a warning to communities along the East Coast of England to prepare for the most serious tidal surge in 30 years, with a significant threat of coastal flooding, associated with Cyclone Xaver.
2017, January 4–5, storm Axel.
2017, January 12–13, (incl. Vidar NO).

Recent storm tides
The flood of 1976 and the "North Frisian Flood" of 1981 brought the highest water levels measured to date on the North Sea coast, but because of sea defences such as improved warning systems and dikes built and modified after the flood of 1962, these led only to property damage.

Comparative table of surge heights along the east coast of Britain

See also
Floods in the Netherlands
Geography of Germany
List of settlements lost to floods in the Netherlands
Storm surge

References

Further reading
 Gevaar van water, water in gevaar uit 2001 
 Methode voor de bepaling van het aantal slachtoffers ten gevolge van een grootschalige overstroming, Ministerie van Verkeer en Waterstaat, Netherlands, 2004

External links
 Munich Re Historical storm surge events
eSurge Surge Event Database: North Sea

 
European windstorms